The Paltin-Nistorești mine is a large salt mine located in eastern Romania in Vrancea County, close to Paltin and Nistorești. Paltin-Nistorești represents one of the largest salt reserves in Romania having estimated reserves of 22 billion tonnes of NaCl.

References 

Salt mines in Romania